The Australian Digital Health Agency, also known as simply Digital Health, is the Australian Government statutory agency responsible for My Health Record, Australia's digital prescriptions and health referral system, and other 'eHealth' programs under the national digital health strategy. The agency used to be called the National E-Health Transition Authority. Through the former Council of Australian Governments Health Council, the agency reports directly to state and territory health ministers and the federal minister for health. The agency is led by its chief executive officer, board, and is subject to directions issued by the minister for health on the approval of all state and territory health ministers.

History 
The Australian Digital Health agency was formed on 30 January 2016 after declaration of the Public Governance, Performance and Accountability (Establishing the Australian Digital Health Agency) Rule 2016 by Minister for Finance Mathias Cormann, and came into effect on 1 July 2016. The declaration followed the federal 201718 federal budget, which announced the formation of a new agency to operate My Health Record. The transition of responsibilities from the former National E-Health Transition Authority was then enacted by Minister for Health Sussan Ley in the Public Governance, Performance and Accountability (Establishing the Australian Digital Health Agency) Transfer Day Notice 2016.

The agency was the first government entity to be created under changes to the Public Governance, Performance and Accountability Act 2013 which allows the federal minister for finance to create federal government agencies without parliamentary passage.

On 4 September 2020, Digital Health announced a new chief executive officer, Amanda Cattermole, who previously was the chief operating officer at Services Australia, the Australian Government agency responsible for welfare payments. Cattermole previously was also the interim chief executive officer for Services Australia, and deputy secretary for health departments for both the federal government and Victoria State Government. Cattermole will begin her role as the chief executive officer on 29 September 2020.

My Health Record 

My Health Record (MHR) is the national healthcare database for Australia. The Australian Digital Health Agency is the legislative System Operator for the system, meaning they have legal responsibility for the security and access of the platform. Every Australian who didn't opt out by 31 January 2019, or who hasn't otherwise deleted their profile, had a MHR profile created for them and tied to their Medicare profile and Unique Healthcare Identifier. MHR was announced in the 201516 federal budget, and the digital health strategy that included MHR was agreed to by all states and territory health ministers in August 2017. MHR is accessible online for patients, or via approved healthcare programs for practitioners or clinical providers.

On 26 November 2018, the Australian federal parliament passed the My Health Records Amendment (Strengthening Privacy) Act 2018 in response to public criticism about the privacy measures of MHR. The act codified privacy policies that: prevent the use of health record data for employment or insurance purposes, prevent law enforcement from accessing data without a court order, authorised patients to completely delete their MHR, reduced the access of parents to the health profiles of under fourteens, increased the penalty for violating healthcare privacy laws, and amongst others, forbids any other government agency from taking operation of MHR (with the exception of the Department of Health and the chief executive of Medicare).

Key figures 
As of July 2020, My Health Record stores:
 22.81 million profiles (89.8% of all Australians)
 2.16 billion healthcare documents
 1.93 billion Medicare or Department of Veterans' Affairs documents
 150 million medication documents
 80 million clinical documents
 322 thousand patient-added documents
 15 million immunisation profiles
 1.5 million organ donation registrations

MHR is being used by:
 99% of all pharmacies in Australia (83% using MHR regularly, an increase of 2% in July 2020)
 93% of all GPs in Australia (83% using MHR regularly)
 95% of all public hospitals in Australia (91% using MHR regularly)

Digital prescriptions and referrals

See also 

 Medicare (Australia)
 Department of Health (Australia)
 Health care in Australia

References

External links 
 
 Department of Health website
 My Health Record website

Electronic health records
Medical and health organisations based in Australia
2016 establishments in Australia
Government agencies of Australia